Xiazhuang is a town in Rongcheng City, Weihai, in eastern Shandong province, China.

References

Township-level divisions of Shandong
Weihai